Johann Christoph Bach (16 June 1671 – 22 February 1721) was a musician of the Bach family. He was the eldest of the brothers of Johann Sebastian Bach who survived childhood.

Life
Johann Christoph was born in Erfurt in June 1671, a few months before the family moved to Eisenach, where Johann Sebastian was born fourteen years later as the last child. In 1686 Johann Christoph was sent to Erfurt to study under Johann Pachelbel for the next three years. By the end of his apprenticeship he was organist in the St. Thomas church in that town for a short time, followed by some months at Arnstadt where several Bach relatives lived.

In 1690 Johann Christoph became organist at the Michaeliskirche at Ohrdruf. In October 1694 he married Dorothea von Hof. His mother Maria Elisabeth Lämmerhirt had died earlier that year, and his father Johann Ambrosius Bach died in March the next year. Two younger brothers, Johann Jacob and Johann Sebastian, who up till then had been living with their father in Eisenach, came to live with Johann Christoph's family in Ohrdruf. At the time, Johann Jacob was thirteen, and Johann Sebastian not even ten. Johann Christoph's five sons were born between 1695 and 1713.

Johann Christoph became his youngest brother's keyboard teacher, or, at least, Johann Sebastian "laid the foundations of his [own] keyboard technique" under the guidance of his eldest brother. An anecdote is told by Johann Sebastian's early biographers:

The brother had however not died "soon after". Having stayed with his brother for five years Johann Sebastian left Ohrdruf, joining the choir of St. Michael's Convent at Lüneburg. Around the time Johann Sebastian left Lüneburg a few years later he composed a Capriccio in E major in honor of his eldest brother, BWV 993. In the years that followed Johann Christoph copied several compositions by his younger brother, such as those in the Andreas Bach Book, kept by one of his sons, and the Möller Manuscript.<ref>Stephen A. Crist. "The early works and the heritage of the seventeenth century", p. 75 ff. in The Cambridge Companion to Bach. edited by John Butt. Cambridge University Press, 1997. </ref>

All of Johann Christoph's sons became musicians, three of them at Ohrdruf. He died, aged 49, in Ohrdruf.

References

Sources
 Charles Sanford Terry. Johann Sebastian Bach: His Life, Art, and Work. Translated from the German of Johann Nikolaus Forkel. With notes and appendices by Charles Sanford Terry. New York: Harcourt, Brace and Howe. 1920.
 Philipp Spitta. Johann Sebastian Bach: His Work and Influence on the Music of Germany (1685–1750)'', translated by Clara Bell and J. A. Fuller Maitland. Volume I, 1899.

1671 births
1721 deaths
German classical organists
German male organists
Johann Christoph
Male classical organists

et:Johann Christoph Bach (1645–93)